Mohd Khairul Bin Ismail (born 11 December 1981, in Johor) is a Malaysian professional footballer who plays as a center back and midfielder.

Club career

Kedah FA (loan)
Khairul gained a limelight during his short spell with Kedah backed in 2004 Malaysia Cup Campaign. He scored the only goal in second leg semi final in Darul Aman Stadium that brought Kedah to final. His header helped Kedah to reached final after 11 years of awaiting. Unfortunately, he did not offered permanent moved and return to Johor. Since Kedah planned to rebuild new squad for upcoming Malaysia Premier League.

Ismail formerly played with Johor FA and Johor FC before signing with Felda United in 2014.

References

External links
 Profile and Stats at Metafootball
 
 Profile at footballmalaysia

1981 births
Living people
Malaysian footballers
People from Johor
Johor Darul Ta'zim F.C. players
Kedah Darul Aman F.C. players
Felda United F.C. players
Malaysia Super League players
Association football defenders